Marianne Synnes  (born 5 June 1970) is a Norwegian medical laboratory scientist, molecular biologist and politician. 
She was elected representative to the Storting for the period 2017–2021 for the Conservative Party.

References

1970 births
Living people
People from Giske
Conservative Party (Norway) politicians
Members of the Storting
Møre og Romsdal politicians